Yevheniya Vysotska (sometimes spelled as Evgeniya Visockaya; ; born 11 December 1975) is a Ukrainian racing cyclist, who most recently rode for UCI Women's Continental Team . She competed in the women's road race at the 2008 Summer Olympics.

References

External links
 

1975 births
Living people
People from Krasnoperekopsk Raion
Ukrainian female cyclists
Cyclists at the 2008 Summer Olympics
Olympic cyclists of Ukraine
21st-century Ukrainian women